The HP LaserJet 1020 is a low cost, low volume, monochromatic laser printer. It was a replacement for the HP LaserJet 1012. The production started in June 2005.

Specifications 
In contrast to less compact, more powerful, laser printers, it only exposes ZjStream externally.
 Print speed, black (normal quality mode) – up to 14 pages/minute.
 Processor speed – 234 MHz
 Memory – 2 MB of RAM
 USB 2.0
 Monthly duty cycle – 8,000 single-sided pages per month (maximum) ; 1,000 single-sided pages per month (average).

Possible health issues 
The LaserJet 1020 was studied to determine particulate emission and its potential effects on health. The 1020 was found to be a moderate emitter of particulates. A full copy of the report can be found here, whereas HP's response can be found here.

Print cartridges 
It uses a black toner print cartridge number Q2612A  with 2,000-page capacity  at the standard five percent coverage.

References 

1020